William Francis Cowper-Temple, 1st Baron Mount Temple, PC (13 December 1811 – 16 October 1888), known as William Cowper (pronounced "Cooper") before 1869 and as William Cowper-Temple between 1869 and 1880, was a British Liberal statesman.

Background and education
Born at Brocket Hall, Hertfordshire, Cowper was the second son of Peter Cowper, 5th Earl Cowper, and the Hon. Emily Lamb, daughter of Peniston Lamb, 1st Viscount Melbourne (since his mother had several lovers there is some doubt about his true paternity). He was the younger brother of George Cowper, 6th Earl Cowper and nephew of Prime Minister Lord Melbourne. His father died in 1837 and in 1839 his mother married another Prime Minister, Lord Palmerston, who became Cowper's stepfather. He was educated at Eton. After entering the Royal Horse Guards in 1830, he was promoted Captain five years later, eventually attaining the rank of brevet Major in 1852.

Political career
In 1835, Cowper was elected Liberal Member of Parliament for Hertford, a seat he held for the next thirty-three years, and became private secretary to his uncle Prime Minister Lord Melbourne. He was appointed a Groom in Waiting in 1837, and in 1841 served for three months as a Lord of the Treasury under Melbourne, only resuming office five years later as a Lord of the Admiralty when the Whigs returned to power under Lord John Russell. He again held this post under Lord Aberdeen from 1852 to 1855, and in the latter year was made Under-Secretary of State for the Home Department by his stepfather Lord Palmerston when he became Prime Minister. In August that same year he was appointed President of the Board of Health, and sworn of the Privy Council. Four years later he became Vice-President of the Board of Trade and Paymaster General, only serving for a year before Palmerston appointed him First Commissioner of Works.

In 1866, on the fall of Lord Russell's government, Cowper left office for good. Two years later he was returned to Parliament for Hampshire South, and held this seat until 1880.

Cowper-Temple was involved in the 1870 Education Act which set up Board Schools (state primary schools, run by elected local school boards) throughout England. He was responsible for the Cowper-Temple clause, an amendment which became Section 14 of the Act. In order to overcome the concerns of Nonconformists that their children might be taught Anglican doctrine, the clause proposed that religious teaching in the new state schools be non-denominational, which in practice meant learning the Bible and a few hymns. Section 7 of the Act also gave parents the right to withdraw their children from any religious instruction provided in board schools, and to withdraw their children at that or other times to attend any other religious instruction of their choice.

When his mother died in 1869, he inherited a number of estates under his stepfather's will, and so took that year under Royal licence the additional surname of Temple. The properties included a 10,000-acre estate on Sligo's Mullaghmore peninsula with its unfinished Classiebawn Castle, commissioned by his stepfather, which he completed by 1874. In 1880 he was raised to the peerage as Baron Mount Temple, of Mount Temple in the County of Sligo. This was a revival of the junior title held by the Viscounts Palmerston, which had become extinct along with the viscountcy on his stepfather's death in 1865.

Apart from his political career Lord Mount Temple organized ecumenical conferences at Broadlands. One of the regular speakers there was George MacDonald.

Personal life

Lord Mount Temple was twice married. He married first Harriet Alicia, daughter of Daniel Gurney, in 1843. After her early death the same year, he married second, in 1848, Georgina Tollemache, daughter of Admiral John Richard Delap Tollemache, and a sister of the 1st Baron Tollemache. Both marriages were childless. He died on 16 October 1888, aged 76, at his home of Broadlands, Hampshire, and was buried at nearby Romsey. His peerage became extinct on his death. Lady Mount Temple died in October 1901, aged 79.

His estates (excluding Shelley House, Chelsea, lived in and inherited by his wife) had already passed to or were inherited by his nephew, the Rt. Hon. Evelyn Ashley, the second son of Anthony Ashley-Cooper, 7th Earl of Shaftesbury.

Legacy
The Canadian Pacific passenger SS Mount Temple, launched in 1901, was named for him. The British rock band The Cooper Temple Clause were also named after him.

Books used for references
 Jenkins, Roy. Gladstone (2002)(originally published 1995), Pan

References

Attribution

External links 
 

|-

1811 births
1888 deaths
Members of the Privy Council of the United Kingdom
Cowper-Temple, William Francis
Cowper-Temple, William Francis
Royal Horse Guards officers
Barons in the Peerage of the United Kingdom
Lords of the Admiralty
William
People educated at Eton College
Cowper-Temple, William
Cowper-Temple, William Francis
Cowper-Temple, William Francis
Cowper-Temple, William Francis
Cowper-Temple, William Francis
Cowper-Temple, William Francis
Cowper-Temple, William Francis
Cowper-Temple, William Francis
Cowper-Temple, William Francis
Cowper-Temple, William Francis
Cowper-Temple, William Francis
UK MPs who were granted peerages
Peers of the United Kingdom created by Queen Victoria